Muhanad Al-Halak (born 31 July 1989) is a German politician of the Free Democratic Party.

Early life
Al-Halak was born in Iraq, and came to Germany with his family as asylum seekers, settling in Grafenau in Bavaria.

Political career
Al-Halak joined the FDP in 2016. He was an unsuccessful candidate in the 2019 European Parliament election in Germany.

Member of the German Parliament, 2021–present
In the 2021 German federal election Al-Halak contested the constituency of Deggendorf and came in 6th place. He was elected on the state list. 

In parliament, Al-Halak has since been serving on the Committee on the Environment, Nature Conservation, Nuclear Safety, and Consumer Protection and the Parliamentary Advisory Board on Sustainable Development. In addition to his committee assignments, he is also a member of the Parliamentary Friendship Group for Relations with Arabic-Speaking States in the Middle East, which is in charge of maintaining inter-parliamentary relations with Bahrain, Irak, Yemen, Jordan, Qatar, Kuwait, Lebanon, Oman, Saudi Arabia, Syria, United Arab Emirates, and the Palestinian territories.

Other activities
 German Foundation for Consumer Protection (DSV), Member of the Board of Trustees (since 2022)

References 

Living people

1989 births
21st-century German politicians
21st-century Iraqi politicians
German people of Iraqi descent
Iraqi emigrants to Germany
Naturalized citizens of Germany
Iraqi refugees
People from Freyung-Grafenau
Members of the Bundestag for Bavaria
Members of the Bundestag for the Free Democratic Party (Germany)
Members of the Bundestag 2021–2025